The Catcher Was a Spy is a 2018 American war film directed by Ben Lewin and written by Robert Rodat, based on the book of the same name by Nicholas Dawidoff. It stars Paul Rudd as Moe Berg, a former baseball player who joined the war effort during World War II and participated in espionage for the U.S. Government. Mark Strong, Sienna Miller, Jeff Daniels, Tom Wilkinson, Giancarlo Giannini, Hiroyuki Sanada, Guy Pearce, and Paul Giamatti also star. The film premiered at the 2018 Sundance Film Festival, and was released on June 22, 2018, by IFC Films.

Plot 
Moe Berg, a 15-year baseball veteran, joins the war effort as a spy to beat Nazi Germany in the race to build the first atomic bomb.
In 1936, Berg is playing for the Boston Red Sox near the end of a long if undistinguished pro career.  On a goodwill baseball exhibition tour of Japan, Berg sneaks onto the roof of a Tokyo hospital to covertly film Tokyo's harbor and Navy shipyards.  The Office of Strategic Services Chief to whom he presents the film is impressed by Berg’s enterprise, as well as the extensive language skills that Berg has picked up at Princeton and elsewhere, and Berg is hired.  Werner Heisenberg, who won the Nobel Prize in 1932 for pioneering quantum physics, is now in charge of the Nazis’ attempts to create an atom bomb. If he succeeds, the Germans could win the war. Berg is smuggled into Italy and then Switzerland, with the task to discover if Heisenberg is anywhere near that goal.  If so, it will fall to Berg to assassinate the brilliant physicist.

Cast

Production 
The project was announced on April 26, 2016, with Ben Lewin hired to direct, Robert Rodat tasked with adapting the biography, and Paul Rudd cast as Moe Berg; PalmStar Media would produce.

In February 2017, Guy Pearce, Jeff Daniels, Paul Giamatti, Sienna Miller, and Giancarlo Giannini were added to the cast. Filming began on February 13, with filming locations being Prague and Boston. Hiroyuki Sanada was cast in March, with Tom Wilkinson, Connie Nielsen, and Shea Whigham joining in April. Principal photography lasted for 30 days.

Release 
The film was set to have its world premiere at the Toronto International Film Festival in September 2017, but the film was pulled out after it was realized that post-production was not completed in time. It premiered at the 2018 Sundance Film Festival. IFC Films acquired the film and set a release date of June 22, 2018.

Reception

Box office
The Catcher Was a Spy made $114,771 from 49 theaters in its opening weekend, for an average of $2,459 per venue.

Critical response
The website's critical consensus reads, "The Catcher Was a Spy loses sight of the most interesting elements of its fact-based story, dropping the ball and leaving likable lead Paul Rudd stranded." On Metacritic, the film has a weighted average score of 49 out of 100, based on 27 critics, indicating "mixed or average reviews".

References

External links 
 

 Interview with director Ben Lewin

2018 films
2018 independent films
2010s English-language films
2018 drama films
2018 biographical drama films
2018 war drama films
2010s spy drama films
American biographical drama films
American spy drama films
American war drama films
Films based on biographies
Films directed by Ben Lewin
Films scored by Howard Shore
Films shot in Boston
Films shot in the Czech Republic
IFC Films films
Spy films based on actual events
World War II spy films
2010s American films